Magellan Rise may refer to:
 Magellan Rise (ocean plateau), an oceanic plateau in the Pacific Ocean.
 Magellan Rise (suburb), a suburb of Hamilton, New Zealand
 North Magellan Rise - Ocean floor feature south west of Hawaii and east of the Marshall Islands
 Former name for Magellan Seamounts